Paolo Poggi (born February 16, 1971 in Venice) is a retired Italian professional football player who played as a striker.

During the 2001–02 Serie A season, Poggi scored the fastest goal in Serie A history, scoring against Fiorentina with Piacenza in the opening eight seconds of the match; this record was later beaten by Rafael Leão in 2020, scoring after six seconds.

References

External links
 Career summary by playerhistory.com 

1971 births
Living people
Italian footballers
Serie A players
Serie B players
Serie C players
Venezia F.C. players
Torino F.C. players
Udinese Calcio players
A.S. Roma players
S.S.C. Bari players
Piacenza Calcio 1919 players
A.C. Ancona players
Mantova 1911 players
Association football forwards